The Driftless Area is a 2015 Canadian-American neo-noir dramedy film directed by Zachary Sluser and starring Anton Yelchin, Zooey Deschanel, and John Hawkes. Alia Shawkat, Aubrey Plaza, Frank Langella, and Ciarán Hinds also appear in supporting roles. The film is based on the 2006 novel of the same title by Tom Drury, who co-wrote the screenplay with Sluser.

Plot
A college graduate turned bartender, Pierre, comes home after his parents' death. Shane picks up Pierre, hitching whilst carrying a rosebush, after his MG car breaks down. Shane then charges Pierre $20 for the privilege and kicks him out of his vehicle further down the road, stealing his rosebush. Pierre takes a rock out of his pocket and hurls it at the car, which causes Shane to crash out cold on the next curve. As Pierre inspects the scene, he finds a $77,000 bag of money in Shane's truck. Shane wakes up from the crash and steals a car from a lady who stopped to help him. 

Pierre is going to give his newfound money to a woman who had given him the rock, and who needs plastic surgery for a badly scarred face. He feels the money is destined for her, since she told him that she could only ever get the needed surgery "if she ever found a pile of money."

Walking through a field, Pierre falls into a well and is rescued by Stella. Pierre feels indebted to her for saving his life, then goes on to fall in love with her. Stella is a ghost, inadvertently killed whilst housesitting, in an arson fire set sometime before by Shane on his brother's orders, believing the house empty. 

Tim Geer is helping Stella deal with her situation and get retribution for a life stolen. Shane, his brother Ned, and Lyle arrive to get back their money. Eventually they catch up to Pierre, who leads the trio into a trap. Over a disagreement at their predicament, short-tempered Shane shoots Lyle through the heart. 

In a shootout Shane and Pierre kill each other. As Shane lies dying Stella appears to him and questions her killing, then comforts Pierre through his last breath. Pierre seemingly knew he was going to die as he wrote a will giving his car to his friend, Carrie, his grey felt hat to Keith, and his binoculars to Stella.

Pierre wakes up on a beach and is greeted by Stella. She explains they are going to have a lot of time together, just as he had wished for before.

Cast
 Anton Yelchin as Pierre Hunter
 Zooey Deschanel as Stella
 John Hawkes as Shane 
 Alia Shawkat as Carrie   
 Aubrey Plaza as Jean    
 Ciarán Hinds as Ned
 Frank Langella as Tim Geer
 Benjamin Rogers as Keith
 Erika Portnoy as Tragic Woman

Filming
Production on the film began on May 14, 2014, in Vancouver, British Columbia, Canada.

Music
The film's original score was composed by Saunder Jurriaans and Daniel Bensi.

Release
The film had its world premiere at the Tribeca Film Festival on April 18, 2015. The film screened as the Opening Night film for the Aruba International Film Festival on October 7, 2015.  Shortly afterwards, it was announced that Sony Pictures Worldwide Acquisitions had acquired distribution rights to the film. The film was released on April 26, 2016, on video on demand and home media formats.

References

External links 
 
 

2015 films
Films based on American novels
2015 comedy-drama films
English-language Canadian films
Canadian comedy-drama films
American comedy-drama films
American neo-noir films
Bron Studios films
Films about bartenders
Films shot in Vancouver
2010s English-language films
2010s Canadian films
2010s American films